The Brother With Two Tongues is a studio album by the American rapper Mellow Man Ace. It was released in 1992 via Capitol Records.

The thirteen-track record featured guest appearances from Sen Dog, Krazy Dee, and Tomahawk Funk. Audio production was handled by Julio G, DJ Muggs, Tony G., and others.

Critical reception

Rolling Stone wrote: "Obviously heeding Cypress Hill's strategy by downplaying the Hispanic angle and adopting a more generic sound, this more marketable but artistically inferior second album offers a bland, eclectic blend."

Track listing

Personnel

Brian Gardner - mastering
Bronek Wroblewski - producer
Christine Beaudet - coordinator (production)
Command A Studios, Inc. - design
Eric Vidal - producer, arranger
Joy Bailey - A&R
Julio Gonzalez - producer, arranger
Lawrence Muggerud - producer
Michael Miller - photography
Morey Alexander - management, executive producer
Nick Vidal - producer, arranger
Ralph Merdano - producer
Sarajo Frieden - design (lettering)
Senen Reyes - guest performer
Steve "Silk" Hurley - producer
Todd Alexander - coordinator (production)
Tommy Steele - art direction
Tony Gonzales - producer, arranger
Tyrone Pachero - guest performer
Ulpiano Sergio Reyes - main artist, executive producer

References 

Mellow Man Ace albums
1992 albums
Capitol Records albums
Albums produced by DJ Muggs